Neptis nebrodes, the broken-club sailer, is a butterfly in the family Nymphalidae. It is found in Sierra Leone, Liberia, Ivory Coast, Ghana, Nigeria, Cameroon, Gabon, the Republic of the Congo, Angola, the Democratic Republic of the Congo (Mayumbe) and possibly Guinea. The habitat consists of forests.

Adult males mud-puddle.

References

Butterflies described in 1874
nebrodes
Butterflies of Africa
Taxa named by William Chapman Hewitson